Castelletto Merli is a comune (municipality) in the Province of Alessandria in the Italian region Piedmont, located about  east of Turin and about  northwest of Alessandria.

Castelletto Merli borders the following municipalities: Alfiano Natta, Cerrina Monferrato, Mombello Monferrato, Moncalvo, Odalengo Piccolo, and Ponzano Monferrato.

References

Cities and towns in Piedmont